This is a list of international presidential trips made by Joe Biden, the 46th and current president of the United States. Joe Biden has made 10 international trips to 17 countries (in addition to visiting the West Bank) during his presidency so far, which began on January 20, 2021.

Summary
The number of visits per country where President Biden traveled are:
 One: Cambodia, Egypt, Indonesia, Israel, Italy, Japan, Mexico, Saudi Arabia, South Korea, Spain, Switzerland, Ukraine, Vatican City, and the West Bank
 Two: Belgium, Germany, Poland
 Five: United Kingdom

2021

2022

2023

Future trips
The following international trips are scheduled to be made by Joe Biden:

Multilateral meetings
Multilateral meetings of the following intergovernmental organizations are scheduled to take place during President Biden's term in office (since 2021).

See also
List of presidential trips made by Joe Biden
Foreign policy of the Joe Biden administration
List of international trips made by Antony Blinken as United States Secretary of State

References

Presidential travels of Joe Biden
Lists of 21st-century trips
21st century in international relations
Biden, Joe, international
Joe Biden-related lists